Aberdeen F.C. competed in Scottish Football League Division One and the Scottish Cup in season 1905–06.

Overview

This was Aberdeen's third season overall and their first season in the top flight of Scottish football. The club were elected to the Division One despite finishing seventh in the Division Two the previous season. The Wasps struggled in Division One, finishing 12th out of 18 clubs and suffered an early exit from the Scottish Cup to Rangers.

Results

Scottish Division One

Final standings

Scottish Cup

Squad

Appearances & Goals

|}

References

Aberdeen F.C. seasons
Aberdeen